Andrew or Andy Fox may refer to:
Andrew F. Fox (1849–1926), U.S. congressman from Mississippi
Andrew Fox (author) (born 1952), American author
Andrew Fox (cricketer) (born 1962), English cricketer
Andy Fox (born 1971), baseball executive and former infielder and coach
Andrew Fox (footballer) (born 1993), British footballer
Andy Fox, a member of the FoxTrot family featured in a comic strip